Cai Yaohui (born January 8, 1988) is a retired Chinese football player who mostly spent his career with Guangzhou Pharmaceutical.

Honours

Club
Guangzhou F.C.
China League One: 2007, 2010

References

External links
 Player profile at sohu.com
 Player profile at Guangzhou Pharmaceutical website

1988 births
Living people
People from Sanshui District
Chinese footballers
Footballers from Foshan
Guangzhou F.C. players
Chinese Super League players
China League One players
Association football midfielders
21st-century Chinese people